Phyllodesmium crypticum is a species of sea slug, an aeolid nudibranch, a marine gastropod mollusc in the family Facelinidae.

Distribution 
This species was described from Angourie, northern New South Wales, Australia. It has been reported from Indonesia and the Red Sea.

Description 
Phyllodesmium crypticum uses camouflage and looks like the soft coral Xenia amongst which it is normally found.  The length of the slug is 45–60 mm. This species contains zooxanthellae and has cerata which have a most distinctive shape. They are dorso-ventrally flattened and quadrangular in cross-section. A row of nodules runs up each of the four edges of the ceras and there are also scattered nodules on the two flat sides.

Ecology 
Phyllodesmium crypticum feeds on Xenia.

References

External links 

Facelinidae
Gastropods described in 1981